Rüdiger Dillmann is a German Robotics Researcher from Karlsruhe Institute of Technology (KIT, aka. Universität Karlsruhe(TH)) in Karlsruhe, Germany. He was named Fellow of the Institute of Electrical and Electronics Engineers (IEEE) in 2012 for contributions to robot programming and human-centered technologies.

The computer science professor served as the chair of the 2013 International Conference on Robotics and Automation.

References

External links

20th-century births
Living people
German roboticists
Academic staff of the Karlsruhe Institute of Technology
Fellow Members of the IEEE
Year of birth missing (living people)
Place of birth missing (living people)